DaYeene was a Swedish soul/house music group, active in early 1990s. The group consisted of the sisters Jeanette and Diane Söderholm. Diane had previously been vocalist in the Swedish synthpop band, Freestyle.

The duo was one of many new Swedish acts associated with the early 1990s Nordik beat scene that specialized in urban music. Notable artists were Papa Dee, Kayo, Rob'n'Raz, and Titiyo. DaYeene guest featured on most of these artists' albums. They were signed to the label SweMix, one of the very early Swedish labels specializing in urban music.

The duo got started when SweMix co-founder StoneBridge did a remix for Frankie LaMotte in 1989, and needed backing vocalists. He loved their voices and signed the sisters.

While the first single, "We're On The Case", was a Salt-n-Pepa inspired hip hop track with the two sisters rapping, the majority of their output was soulful club music. "And It Hurts" was released as a single in the summer of 1999, including in the UK. Two albums were released in the 1990s, with their biggest hits being "Alright" in February 1991, and "Revelation" in November 1993. It belatedly peaked at No. 63 in the UK Singles Chart in July 1999,

During this time, Jeanette Söderholm also worked as an in-house backing vocalist at Cheiron Studios.

Personal life
Diane Söderholm is married to Sten Hallström (aka StoneBridge), and they have two children. Jeanette is married to Swedish songwriter and producer Jonas von der Burg, and works under her married name Jeanette von der Burg.

The sisters are the half-sisters of Rita Marley, wife of Bob Marley.

Discography

Albums
United Soul Power (1990)
"Believe"	 2:05	
"Big Bad World"	 4:37	
"I Found You"	 3:19	
"D.D.D. (Dead Drearie Dearie)"	 3:25	
"Dizzy Morning" 3:00	
"Drive My Car" 3:02	
"Go To Work"	1:23	
"Solution" 4:43	
"The B-Side"	2:40	
"United Soul Power" 4:54	
"Karma Is The Sign" 3:18
"We're On This Case" 3:08	
"I'm Coming"  4.01		
Primetime (1992)
"Prime Time" (The K Mix) 4:14
"Alright" 4:24
"Good Thing" 3:52
"Freedom" 3:40
"Your Love" 3:16
"Love The Reggae Bad" 4:47
"To Be Yourself" 3:37
"Around The World" 3:20
"Who's Gonna Take You Back" 4:46
"Danger Lovin'" 3:43
"Love The Reggae Bad" (Yellow Cab Mix) 3:28
"D'Yall's Gonna Rock The Place" (Moronic Dub Edit) 4:02
"Prime Time" (The Original Big Bass Dub) 2:55

Singles

References

Swedish dance music groups
Swedish musical duos
Electronic music duos
English-language singers from Sweden
Female musical duos
Sibling musical duos